Helmuth Luik (19 February 1928, Paikuse, Pärnu County, Estonia – 5 May 2009, Tallinn) was an Estonian chess player, who won the Estonian Chess Championship.

Biography
In 1949, Helmuth Luik graduated from the Tallinn College of Physical Education. After graduation, he worked as a chess coach and arbiter in Pärnu. In the Estonian Chess Championships, he has won gold (1967), 2 silver (1954, 1965) and bronze (1963) medals.
In 1967 Baltic Chess Championship Helmuth Luik became a Soviet Master. In 1967 he participated in Soviet Chess Championships in Kharkiv. In 1969, he won «Kalev» Chess Championship. Five times Helmuth Luik played for Estonia in Soviet Team Chess Championships (1958, 1960-1967) and two times played for Estonian team «Kalev» in Soviet Team Chess Cup	(1966, 1968).

Helmuth Luik has held senior administrator positions in the Estonian chess - Estonian Chess Club president (1967-1975), deputy director and director of the Paul Keres House of Chess (1975-1992), member of the Estonian Chess Federation Presidium.

References

External links
 
 
 Helmuth Luik player profile at OlimpBase.org (Soviet Team Chess Championship)
 Helmuth Luik player profile at OlimpBase.org (Soviet Team Chess Cup)

1928 births
2009 deaths
People from Pärnu
Estonian chess players
Soviet chess players
20th-century chess players